The Chinese Ambassador to South Sudan is the official representative of the People's Republic of China to the Republic of South Sudan.

List of representatives

See also
China–South Sudan relations

References 

Ambassadors of China to South Sudan
China
South Sud